Melvyn Morris Betts (born 26 March 1975) is an English cricketer. He is a right-handed batsman and a right-arm medium-fast bowler.

Born in Sacriston, County Durham, Betts was educated at Fyndoune Community College in Sacriston. Betts participated in Under-19s cricket and Under-20s cricket with Durham, but left in September 2000 upon the refusal of an improvement in his contract. 
In November, Betts drew up a three-year contract with Warwickshire after they had lost Ed Giddins, Allan Donald an

External links
 Melvyn Betts at ECB
 Melvyn Betts at Cricinfo
 Melvyn Betts at CricketArchive 

1975 births
Living people
English cricketers
Durham cricketers
Middlesex cricketers
Warwickshire cricketers
People from Sacriston
Cricketers from County Durham
NBC Denis Compton Award recipients